Rangsazi Iran - Iran Paint Manufacturing Company - شرکت رنگسازي ايران, was founded in 1939 as the first paint producer in Iran as well as the Middle East. Rangsazi Iran is currently the top producer in decorative and industrial paints within the country in terms of volume of sales and quality.

History
The company was founded by Ahmad Sanei in 1939. Ahmad Sanei is the founder of the paint industry in Iran. The first factory was set up in Zargande in the Shemiran district of Tehran. In 1959, a larger facility was acquired by the company on Saveh road in Tehran.

Products

Paint

High gloss enamel alkyd paint
Matt alkyd paint
Alkyd undercoat paint
Emulsion paint
Emulsion paint (Distemper)
Emulsion acrylic paint
Pool paint
Alkyd anti rust
Alkyd varnish
Aluminum paint
Traffic paint
Nitrocellulose putties
Nitrocellulose sealer
Nitrocellulose clear
Epoxy paint
Thinner

Resin

Long oil alkyd
Medium oil alkyd
Quick air drying alkyd
Coconut Short oil alkyd
Soya short oil alkyd
Curt acid short oil alkyd
Palm kernel short oil alkyd
Castor short oil alkyd
Kardura short Oil alkyd
Butylated melamine resin
Butylated urea resin
Maleic resin

Driers
Cobalt octoate
Lead octoate
Calcium octoate

References

External links
Official Website
Integrity Paint Supply
History of the paint and resin industry in Iran
Iran strebt Ausbau der chemischen Industrie an
Sanktionen bremsen Irans Chemische Industrie
Paint & Resin Manufacturers Association Of Iran

Paint manufacturers
Manufacturing companies established in 1939
1939 establishments in Iran
Manufacturing companies of Iran
Manufacturing companies based in Tehran
Iranian brands